Liu Haitao (born August 12, 1982 ) is a Chinese pool player. Haitao reached the semi-final of the 2012 WPA World Eight-ball Championship, and the 2013 World Games. Haitao won the doubles event at the 2017 Asian Indoor Games; alongside snooker player Lyu Haotian.

Achievements
 2019 Chinese Pool World Masters
 2018 World Cup of Pool - with (Wu Jia-qing) 
 2017 Asian Indoor and Martial Arts Games 9-Ball Doubles
 2014 WPA World Team Championship

References

External links
 Liu Haitao on AZ Billiards

Chinese pool players
1982 births
Living people
Cue sports players at the 2010 Asian Games
Asian Games competitors for China